Lilliput Glacier is the smallest named glacier in the Sierra Nevada of California. In terms of area this is about the size of 48 typical suburb (1/4 acre or approx. 100' × 100') lots that single family homes are built on. This glacier lies on the shaded north-facing vertical cliff of Mount Stewart, being the southernmost named glacier in the United States.

See also
List of glaciers in the United States

References

Glaciers of California
Sequoia National Park
Glaciers of the Sierra Nevada (United States)
Glaciers of Tulare County, California